Lake Great Falls was a prehistoric proglacial lake which existed in what is now central Montana in the United States between 15,000 BCE and 11,000 BCE. Centered on the modern city of Great Falls, Montana, Glacial Lake Great Falls extended as far north as Cut Bank, Montana, and as far south as Holter Lake. At present-day Great Falls, the Glacial Lake Great Falls reached a depth of 600 feet (183 metres).

Approximately 1.5 million years ago, the Missouri River, the Yellowstone River and Musselshell River all flowed northward into a terminal lake. During the last glacial period, the Laurentide and Cordilleran ice sheets pushed these lakes and rivers southward. Between 15,000 BCE and 11,000 BCE, the Laurentide Ice Sheet blocked the Missouri River and created Glacial Lake Great Falls.

About 13,000 BCE, as the glacier retreated, Glacial Lake Great Falls emptied catastrophically in a glacial lake outburst flood. The meltwater poured through the Highwood Mountains and eroded the hundred mile-long,  Shonkin Sag—one of the most famous prehistoric meltwater channels in the world.

Bibliography
Alden, W. C., 1958, Physiography And Glacial Geology Of Eastern Montana And Adjacent Areas, U. S. Geological Survey Professional Paper 174.
Colton, R. B., Lemke, R. W., and Lindvall, R. M., 1961, Glacial map of Montana East of the Rocky Mountains, U. S. Geological Survey Miscellaneous Geological Investigations Map I-327.
Lindvall, R. M., 1962, Geology Of The Eagle Buttes Quadrangle, Chouteau County, Montana, U. S. Geological Survey Miscellaneous Geological Investigations Map I-349.
Thornbury, W. D., 1965, Regional Geomorphology Of The United States, John Wiley & Sons, Inc., New York.

See also
List of prehistoric lakes
Proglacial lakes of the Missouri River Basin
Lake Cut Bank
Lake Chouteau
Lake Great Falls
Lake Musselshell
Lake Jordan.
Lake Circle
Lake Glendive
Lake McKenzie

References

Former lakes of the United States
Geology of Montana
Glacial lakes of the United States
Natural history of Montana
Proglacial lakes
Great Falls, Montana